Takikawa Dam is a rockfill dam located in Akita Prefecture in Japan. The dam is used for irrigation. The catchment area of the dam is 3.8 km2. The dam impounds about 9  ha of land when full and can store 690 thousand cubic meters of water. The construction of the dam was started on 1984 and completed in 1998.

References

Dams in Akita Prefecture
1998 establishments in Japan